Zigzag is a 1963 film directed by Ronald Remy and starring George Nader. Produced by Albert Zugsmith, it was made in the Philippines.

Cast
 George Nader as The Blind Hunter
 Sylvia Lawrence as Sylvia Lawrence

Production
Filming took place in the Philippines in May 1963. It was the first of a five-picture deal Nader signed with Medallion Pictures. He was meant to follow it with Walk by the Sea, directed by himself, in Hong Kong. Nader had previously made The Great Space Adventure for producer Albert Zugsmith in the Philippines.

References

External links
 

1963 films
Philippine action drama films
1960s English-language films